The Women's omnium at the UCI Track Cycling World Championships was first contested in 2009 in Poland.

The format of the multi-race endurance event ("Omnium" coming from the Latin Omnia, for all) has evolved rapidly since its introduction in 2009. In its first iteration, the competition consisted of 5 events over a single day; a 'flying lap', a time trial over 200 metres with a rolling start, a scratch race, an individual pursuit time trial, a points race, and a 500 metre time trial. Riders were awarded points to match their placing in each event (1 for 1st, 2 for 2nd, etc) and the lowest cumulative score won the competition, with tie-breaks broken by cumulative times in the timed elements of the race.

In 2011, the competition was extended to six events: a 250m flying start time trial; a 5 km scratch race; an elimination race or 'Devil'; an individual pursuit; a 10 km points race; and a 500m time trial. Again, the placing a rider achieved in each event is converted to points, and the rider with the fewest points at the end of the competition won.

In 2015 the order and scoring of the events changed. The points race was moved to the finale event, and the five earlier events allowed riders to win points (with a maximum of 40 for 1st place) to carry into the final points race, whereupon points won in that race were simply added to the total, with the highest scoring rider (carried points included) at the end of that race declared the winner of the event.

In 2017 the first major change of events since 2011 took place, as the three timed elements were removed entirely, and a new fourth event the tempo race introduced. The format of carrying points over from the first three events into the final points race was maintained.

Laura Trott and Katie Archibald, both of Great Britain, Tara Whitten of Canada,  Sarah Hammer of the United States and Kirsten Wild of the Netherlands are the only cyclists to have won the title more than once, taking two gold medals each in 2012 & 2016, 2017 & 2021, 2010 & 2011, 2013 & 2014 and 2018 & 2019 respectively. Trott's three silver medals to Wild's one silver and two bronze medals makes Laura Trott, now Laura Kenny, marginally the most successful athlete overall in the history of the event. Along with Katie Archibald's 2017 and 2021 gold medals and Lizzie Armistead's silver, it also makes Great Britain the most successful nation in the event.

Medalists

Medal table

External links
Track Cycling World Championships 2016–1893 bikecult.com
World Championship, Track, Omnium, Elite cyclingarchives.com

 
Women's omnium
Lists of UCI Track Cycling World Championships medalists